Khaled Khalfan (Arabic:خالد خلفان, born 23 January 1996) is an Emirati footballer. He currently plays for Ajman as a midfielder .

Personal life
Khaled is the brother of the player Mohammed Khalfan and Eisa Khalfan.

Career

Al-Ain
Khaled Khalfan started his career at Al-Ain and is a product of the Al-Ain's youth system. On 28 April 2018, Khaled Khalfan made his professional debut for Al-Ain against Al-Fujairah in the Pro League, replacing Rashed Eisa.

Hatta
On 1 July 2020, he signed with Hatta. on 26 July 2020, the player's contract with Hatta was canceled.

References

External links
 

1996 births
Living people
Emirati footballers
Al Ain FC players
Hatta Club players
UAE Pro League players
Association football midfielders
Place of birth missing (living people)